Tit-Ary is the name of several rural localities in the Sakha Republic, Russia:
Tit-Ary, Khangalassky District, Sakha Republic, a selo in Tit-Arynsky Rural Okrug of Khangalassky District
Tit-Ary, Ust-Aldansky District, Sakha Republic, a selo in Tit-Arynsky Rural Okrug of Ust-Aldansky District